Novyi Buh Raion was a subdivision of Mykolaiv Oblast of Ukraine. Its administrative center was the town of Novyi Buh. The raion was abolished on 18 July 2020 as part of the administrative reform of Ukraine, which reduced the number of raions of Mykolaiv Oblast to four. The area of Novyi Buh Raion was merged into Bashtanka Raion. The last estimate of the raion population was 

At the time of disestablishment, the raion consisted of three hromadas, 
 Novyi Buh urban hromada with the administration in Novyi Buh;
 Sofiivka rural hromada with the administration in the selo of Sofiivka;
 Vilne Zaporizhzhia rural hromada with the administration in the selo of Vilne Zaporizhzhia.

References

Former raions of Mykolaiv Oblast
1922 establishments in Ukraine
Ukrainian raions abolished during the 2020 administrative reform